Stag Hunt (French: Chasse au cerf) is an oil on canvas painting by Flemish painter Paul Bril. It was probably painted in the 1590s, and is currently housed at the Louvre in Paris. The painting was once part of the collection of Louis XIV.

Painting
Paul Bril completed this painting during his stay in Rome, where he moved in the late 1570s or early 1580s. In Rome, Bril went on to become the most influential landscapist of his time.

Bril painted imaginary landscapes typical of the Flemish tradition, following the example of painters such as Joachim Patinir, Herri met de Bles and Pieter Bruegel the Elder. The early work of Hans Bol was also a source of inspiration for Bril.

Bril and the Flemish landscapists didn't either paint nor draw studies en plein air. This painting, too, is a studio product from the artist's imagination. In the painting, six hunters are hunting down a stag into a marsh, illuminated by discernible rays of sunlight. Two hunters are riding a horse, one is in the foreground, the other is visible in a clearing among the trees closing the painting to the left, in the background. On the bottom right, some rabbits are running away or taking refuge below the rooted bank. From the rider's horse jumping forward in the foreground, the painting recedes, in a slanted and undulated view, to the bosky landscape visible through an opening. The strong colors and the skillful articulation thereof in the landscape as well as the quality of the animal animation, far superior to that of Bril's Chasse au daim ("Fallow deer Hunt," INV. 1108, also at the Louvre), confirm the attribution of the Deer Hunt to Paul Bril. The painting was part of the collection of King Luis XVI of France, who acquired it from a merchant Alvarez in 1682.

References

External links
The painting at the Louvre
Painting at the French Ministry of Culture

1590s paintings
Paintings in the Louvre by Dutch, Flemish and German artists
Arts in Paris
Landscape paintings
Paintings by Paul Bril
Dogs in art
Deer in art
Horses in art
Rabbits and hares in art